Jedediah Wilder Granger (October 25, 1818August 17, 1902) was an American farmer, Republican politician, and pioneer settler of Iowa and South Dakota.  He was a member of the Wisconsin State Assembly, representing Chippewa and Dunn counties in the 1870 session.

Early life
Jedediah Granger was born in Sodus, New York, in October 1818.  He was raised and educated in New York.  After his marriage, in 1840, he moved west to Mackinac County, Michigan, where he worked in the logging industry as a surveyor and estimator.

In 1855, he moved to Allamakee County, Iowa, where he purchased a farm in Post Township.  While living in Allamakee County, he became involved in local politics and was elected county coroner, serving from 1859 through 1861.

Civil War service
In 1862, Granger volunteered for service in the Union Army and was commissioned first lieutenant in Company A, 27th Iowa Infantry Regiment.  He was wounded at the Battle of Pleasant Hill in April 1864.  Near the end of the war, he was designated for promotion to captain, but he was never mustered at that rank.  He mustered out with the regiment in August 1865.

Postbellum years
After returning from the war, Granger moved to Dunn County, Wisconsin.  He established a farm in the town of New Haven and was soon elected to the county board of supervisors.  In 1869, he was elected to the Wisconsin State Assembly, running on the Republican Party ticket.  He represented both Dunn County and neighboring Chippewa County.  After his legislative term, he relocated to a farm in the town of Tiffany, Wisconsin.  He worked as a census-taker in Dunn County for the 1880 United States census.  

After the death of his wife in 1882, Granger sold his property in Wisconsin and moved west to a farm in Webster, Dakota Territory, where he remained for the rest of his life.

He died at his farm in Webster on August 17, 1902.

Personal life and family
Jedediah Wilder Granger was named for his uncle Jedediah Wilder.  Iowa Supreme Court justice Charles T. Granger was a first cousin and was also an officer of the 27th Iowa Infantry Regiment during the war.  Union Army general Gordon Granger was a second cousin.  The Grangers were descendants of Launcelot Granger, who was kidnapped as a child from England and brought to the Massachusetts Bay Colony as an indentured servant in the 1640s.

Jedediah Granger married Mary Baker, of Greene County, New York, on February 2, 1840.  He and his wife had ten children, but only one child outlived them.

Their eldest son Robert E. Granger enrolled as a private in the 1st Iowa Cavalry Regiment and was mortally wounded at the Battle of Bayou Meto, in Arkansas; he was 20 years old.

Their second son, Charles, also enrolled with the 1st Iowa Cavalry and survived the entire war, mustering out in 1865.

References

1818 births
1902 deaths
People from Sodus, New York
People from Mackinac County, Michigan
People from Allamakee County, Iowa
People from Dunn County, Wisconsin
People of Dakota Territory
People from Webster, South Dakota
County officials in Iowa
County officials in Wisconsin
Members of the Wisconsin State Assembly
People of Iowa in the American Civil War
Union Army officers
American coroners